Yar Ali may refer to:

Yar Ali, Lorestan
Yar Ali, West Azerbaijan

See also
Yarali (disambiguation)
Ali Yar (disambiguation)